Japanobotrychum is a genus of ferns in the family Ophioglossaceae with the sole species Japanobotrychum lanuginosum. The genus is accepted in the Pteridophyte Phylogeny Group classification of 2016 (PPG I) (under the name "Japanobotrychium"), but not by some other sources.

Taxonomy
The genus Japanobotrychum was first described in 1931 by the Japanese botanist Genkei Masamune, with the only species being Japanobotrychum arisanense. This is now considered to be a synonym of Botrychium lanuginosum Wall. ex Hook. & Grev., first described in 1828, so the epithet lanuginosum has priority over arisanense. The Pteridophyte Phylogeny Group classification of 2016 (PPG I) accepts the genus (with the spelling "Japanobotrychium"), with one species, as did the Checklist of Ferns and Lycophytes of the World , whereas Plants of the World Online subsumed the genus into Botrychium.

Distribution
Japanobotrychum lanuginosum is widely distributed, mainly in tropical Asia, being found from West Himalaya and India through southern China and Mainland Southeast Asia to New Guinea.

References

Ophioglossaceae
Monotypic fern genera